Rochia elata is a species of sea snail, a marine gastropod mollusk in the family Tegulidae.

Description
The size of the shell varies between 30 mm and 70 mm. It generally weighs 20-50 grams, and in some rare cases nearly 100 grams.

Distribution
This marine species occurs off the Philippines, though some cases have been reported in the Bikini Atoll.

References

External links
 To World Register of Marine Species
 
 Lamarck, (J.-B. M.) de. (1822). Histoire naturelle des animaux sans vertèbres. Tome septième. Paris: published by the Author, 711 pp
 Alf, A. (2021). Was wissen wir über die Tegulidae?. Club Conchylia Mitteilungen. 38: 49-60

elata
Gastropods described in 1822